Bandleader, arranger, conductor, record producer and trumpeter Joseph J. Leahy (July 25, 1916 - September 12, 1974) (aged 58) was a native of Boston, Massachusetts. He joined Les Brown and his Band of Renown at twenty, then the Charlie Barnet band and later the Artie Shaw band, eventually forming his own orchestra for cross-country tours of ballrooms, hotel circuits, college proms and one-nighters.

Joining the United States Army in 1941, he headed the forty-man Army Air Forces Orchestra of the Air Transport Command, for which he wrote all the arrangements. The orchestra gave weekly broadcasts over CBS.

His other Air Force duties included arranging and conducting for variety shows, half-hour transcriptions, cue music and orchestral works, and a two-year world tour arranging and conducting for troop shows.

Upon leaving the service in 1945 he came to New York and signed with CBS as a staff conductor-arranger, doing script-show music, background music for radio dramas, and conducting the Skitch Henderson orchestra. Just over a year later he began doing freelance arranging and conducting, and for six years thereafter he orchestrated over one hundred radio programs including the longstanding Don McNeil's The Breakfast Club in Chicago, Illinois.

Other radio and television shows for which he did uncredited background music included those for Orson Welles, Rita Hayworth Eddie Cantor, Tony Martin, Ethel Waters, Constance Bennett and many others.

By 1954, Joe Leahy moved into the record industry by forming his own label, Majar Records, which had an immediate hit: "If I Give My Heart to You" (Majar 27), arranged and conducted by Leahy and sung by Denise Lor. The tune inspired eighteen other cover versions.

Leahy followed up with "Unsuspecting Heart", sung by Terri Stevens; "Green Fire", the song from Desiree, and then he introduced "How Important Can It Be?" with Jack Smith.

In 1955 he joined the RKO Unique record label based at 1440 Broadway in New York, which soon had a top-ten hit with "The Man in the Raincoat" sung by Priscilla Wright in her first recording.
Joe Leahy's first album was Lovely Lady (LP-106) for RKO Unique.

Leahy charted under his own name on a few occasions. Among these performances are "Moonlight Bay" (Music Vendor Pop #53, 1958) and "Life" (Billboard Easy Listening #33, 1965).

Though Joe Leahy's music has been nearly forgotten in the 21st century, many of Joe Leahy's albums have recently been re-released on compact discs.

Popular-song and instrumental compositions
Across My Eyes
Act of Contrition
Alone in Barcelona
April
Baby Blues
Beyond the Stars
Birth of Christ
Blue Trumpet
Burnt the Envelope
By Love Possessed: 
Chantilly
Cloud Nine
Coronet
Detroit Polka
The Dixie Roll
First Time Love
From Your Heart: (Composed by Rolande Maxwell Young Schrade(ASCAP), arrangement by collaborator Joe Leahy)
Gilligan
Go Ahead and Be a Woman
Goodnight, Dream Boy
El Gringo
Hand Full of Dreams
The Happy Surfer
Happy Wedding Polka
High Midnight; Hold On
Holiday in Venice
I Don't Mind
I'm in Love with the Man in a Raincoat
Just a Sandy Haired Boy
Lacerations
Let's Take it from the Top
Life
The Little Spinet
Look Up a Friend Called Jesus; 
LOVE STORY; MARGIN OF ERROR; 
MARY LOU WILSON AND JOHNNY; 
MEXICO HOLIDAY; 
MIRACLE OF LOVE (from A WORLD OF MIRACLES); 
MISUNDERSTOOD; 
MORE THAN ANYTHING; 
MY CATEGORY IS LOVE (Composed by Rolande Maxwell Young Schrade(ASCAP) with arrangement by collaborator Joe Leahy)
MY HIDDEN LOVE; 
MY KINGDOM FOR A KISS (Composed by Rolande Maxwell Young Schrade(ASCAP) with  arrangement by collaborator Joe Leahy)
NEW OPENING; 
NOAH'S ARK; 
ON THE BOULEVARD; 
OPEN, CLOSE, I DON'T KNOW; 
OVERWORKED AND UNDERPAID BLUES; 
A PAIR OF QUEENS; 
THE PROMISED LAND; 
RADIO; 
RUNAWAY; 
SABOTAGE; 
SAY GOODNIGHT; 
SILVERPLATE SHUFFLE; 
SO ALIVE; A STAR IN THE EAST (from A WORLD OF MIRACLES); 
STOP AND THINK; 
THE STORY OF JAMES DEAN; 
THEME FROM STUDIO X;
SUN VALLEY MOON (Composed by Rolande Maxwell Young Schrade (ASCAP) with the arrangement by collaborator Joe Leahy)
SUNSHINE RAIN (Composed by Rolande Maxwell Young Schrade(ASCAP) with the arrangement by collaborator Joe Leahy)
SWISS HOLIDAY; 
TABASCO ROAD; 
TELL ME YOU'RE IN LOVE; 
TEN COMMANDMENTS; 
THERE'S A DREAM IN MY HEART (Composed by Rolande Maxwell Young Schrade (ASCAP) with the arrangement by collaborator Joe Leahy)
THINGS I SHOULDN'T KNOW (Composed by Rolande Maxwell Young Schrade (ASCAP) with the arrangement by collaborator Joe Leahy)
THINK LOVE
THIRTY THREE YEARS (from A WORLD OF MIRACLES)
TWICE AROUND THE ISLAND
TWO HEARTS; WARM RAIN
WIDE IS THE GATE
THE WONDERFUL TEENS
WORLD OF MIRACLES (title song) 
WOULD YOU BELIEVE IT
YOU AND YOUR LOVE
YOU GO I GO;
YOUR HERO

American bandleaders
1916 births
1974 deaths
20th-century American musicians